O. tropicalis  may refer to:
 Ophisma tropicalis, a moth species found in tropical and subtropical America
 Otomys tropicalis, the tropical Vlei rat, a rodent species found in Burundi, Democratic Republic of the Congo, Kenya, Rwanda, Sudan and Uganda

See also